Theodore Yip was an Indonesian-Dutch businessman and a former Formula One team owner in the 1970s.

Early life and business career
Yip spoke many languages including six Chinese variants (most notably Hakka being his native tongue, Mandarin and Cantonese due to his residence in Hong Kong and Macau), Dutch (through his life experience during the Dutch colonial rule and the owning of his Dutch citizenship), English, French, German, Malay (Indonesian) (since he was born and spent his childhood in Indonesia prior his move to the Netherlands for his studies) and Thai which helped him expand his businesses into property and finance.

Family
In January 2019, Yip's adopted son, Willy, died in a Hong Kong hospital from injuries he had received in a school bus crash in the previous month.

References

Sources
Profile at www.grandprix.com

1907 births
2003 deaths
20th-century Dutch businesspeople
Businesspeople in financial services sector
Businesspeople in real estate
Dutch chief executives
Dutch motorsport people
Dutch people of Chinese descent
Formula One team owners
Formula One team principals
Indonesian chief executives
Indonesian emigrants to the Netherlands
Indonesian people of Chinese descent
People from Medan
People from Meixian District